The Southwest Baptist University Bearcats football program represents Southwest Baptist University in college football and competes in the Division II level of the National Collegiate Athletics Association (NCAA). In 2014, Southwest Baptist became a football-only member of the Great Lakes Valley Conference and remains a football-only member through the 2018–19 school year, after which it will become a full GLVC member. Prior to this SBU was in the Mid-America Intercollegiate Athletics Association from 1988 to 2007 and 2012 to 2013, the rest of the athletic programs are in the MIAA. SBU's home games are played at Plaster Stadium in Bolivar, Missouri.

History
Southwest Baptist's football program dates back to 1983 when the program went 0–5. Since their inaugural season the Bearcats have played in five conferences and have been an NCAA Division II member since 1986.

In 2016, Coach Robert Clardy earned GLVC Coach of the Year honors after leading the Bearcats to their first-ever conference title and NCAA National Playoff appearance after finishing the season 10-2 (7-1 GLVC). The 2016 Bearcats were ranked as high as 17th in the NCAA Division II AFCA poll, and were ranked 22nd in the final poll. SBU broke 13 team records and 15 individual records in the 2016 season, including most wins and most conference wins in a single season, while also recording a record 19 All-GLVC and 10 All-Region honorees. The Bearcats had three All-Americans and finished with the 10th best total offense in the NCAA Division II.

In 2018, the team went winless, finishing 0-10 while allowing over 38 points per game on defense.

Head coaching record

Conference affiliations
 1983–1985 NAIA Independent
 1986–1987 NCAA Division II Independent
 1988–2007 Mid-America Intercollegiate Athletics Association
 2007–2011 NCAA Division II Independent
 2012–2013 Mid-America Intercollegiate Athletics Association
 2014–present Great Lakes Valley Conference

Stadium

The Bearcats have played their home games at Plaster Stadium since 1985. Plaster Stadium was named for Robert W. Plaster, the major donor for the project. The current capacity of the stadium is at 3,000.

References

 
American football teams established in 1983
1983 establishments in Missouri